"Daddy's Home" is a famous song by American doo-wop group Shep and the Limelites. The song was written by the three members of the band, James "Shep" Sheppard (1935–1970), Clarence Bassett (1936–2005) and Charles Baskerville. The group recorded the original version of "Daddy's Home" on February 1, 1961, and it was released on Hull Records in March 1961 with the B-side being "This I Know".

"Daddy's Home" reached no. 2 on the Billboard popular music chart in May 1961.  It was kept from No.1 by "Travelin' Man" by Ricky Nelson.

Later songs by the band were not as successful as "Daddy's Home", but still sold well.

Part of a song cycle
The song is an example of James Sheppard's legacy of composing of rock 'n' roll's first-ever song cycle titles, telling the story of a relationship, beginning with going home to his girl, and further twists along the way, like getting married, celebrating their anniversary, problems encountered etc. The songs that told this story cycle were famously  "A Thousand Miles Away", "500 Miles to Go", both with the Heartbeats; and continued with "Daddy's Home", "Three Steps from the Altar," "Our Anniversary", and "What Did Daddy Do?" for Shep and the Limelites.

Chart history

Weekly charts

Year-end charts

Covers
The song was covered by many artists including P. J. Proby (1970), Frank Zappa (1971), Jermaine Jackson (1972), Toots and the Maytals (Funky Kingston 1973), The Carpenters (‘’Live In Japan’’ 1974, Richard Carpenter lead), Junior English, and Cliff Richard (1981).

Jermaine Jackson

Jermaine Jackson covered the song for his 1972 debut solo album, Jermaine, and it was released as the 2nd single from the album. His version featured the rest of the Jackson 5 on backing vocals. The single peaked at number 9 on the US Billboard Hot 100 and number 3 in Canada in March 1973.

His version was sampled in the 1973 break-in record "Super Fly Meets Shaft" (US #31).

Chart history

Weekly charts

Year-end charts

Cliff Richard version

British singer Cliff Richard released a live version as a single for the Christmas period in 1981. It was the second single to be lifted from his 1981 album Wired for Sound.

The song became an international hit reaching number 2 on the UK Singles Chart and number 23 on US Billboard Hot 100 in March 1982 - almost twenty years after the release of the original by Shep and the Limelites. In Britain, it was certified Gold by the BPI for sales over 500,000.

A video clip was recorded to accompany the single release instead of using footage of the original BBC live recording.

Chart performance and certifications

Weekly charts

Year-end charts

Certifications

References

External links
 
 
 

1961 songs
1961 singles
1972 singles
1981 singles
Motown singles
EMI Records singles
Cliff Richard songs
Jermaine Jackson songs